Tokkeitai （特警隊） may refer to:

Tokubetsu-keisatsu-tai, military police of the Imperial Japanese Navy until the end of World War II
Tokubetsu-keibi-tai (Metropolitan Police Department), an Emergency Service Unit of the Tokyo Metropolitan Police Department prior to World War II
, a rapid reaction force of the Japanese Imperial Guard
Special Boarding Unit, a special forces unit of the Japan Maritime Self-Defense Force, established in 2001